The North Dakota National Guard consists of the:
North Dakota Army National Guard
North Dakota Air National Guard

It is part of the North Dakota Office of the Adjutant General. The North Dakota Department of Emergency Services and North Dakota Wing Civil Air Patrol also fall under the Office of the Adjutant General.

External links
Bibliography of North Dakota Army National Guard History compiled by the United States Army Center of Military History

National Guard (United States)
Military in North Dakota